Sigma Serpentis, Latinized from σ Serpentis, is a star in the equatorial constellation Serpens. It is faintly visible to the naked eye with an apparent visual magnitude of +4.82. Based upon an annual parallax shift of 36.67 mas as seen from Earth, it is located 89 light years from the Sun. The star is moving closer to the Sun with a radial velocity of −49 km/s.

Barry (1970) assigned this star a stellar classification of F3 V, indicating an ordinary F-type main-sequence star. However, Houk and Swift (1999) classified it as A9 Ib/II, suggesting instead that this is an evolved F-type bright giant/supergiant. It is about one billion years old and is spinning with a projected rotational velocity of 77.7 km/s. The star has an estimated 1.58 times the mass of the Sun and is radiating 7.7 times the Sun's luminosity from its photosphere at an effective temperature of 6,952 K.

References

F-type main-sequence stars
Serpentis, Sigma
Serpens (constellation)
Durchmusterung objects
Serpentis, 50
147449
080179
6093